The 2019–20 season will be Budafoki MTE's 59th competitive season, 3rd consecutive season in the Merkantil Bank Liga and 108th year in existence as a football club.

First team

Transfers

Summer

In:

Out:

Winter

In:

Out:

Nemzeti Bajnokság II

League table

Results summary

Results by round

Matches

Hungarian Cup

Statistics

Appearances and goals
Last updated on 14 March 2020.

|-
|colspan="14"|Players no longer at the club:

|}

Top scorers
Includes all competitive matches. The list is sorted by shirt number when total goals are equal.
Last updated on 14 March 2020

Disciplinary record
Includes all competitive matches. Players with 1 card or more included only.

Last updated on 14 March 2020

Overall
{|class="wikitable"
|-
|Games played || 30 (27 Merkantil Bank Liga and 3 Hungarian Cup)
|-
|Games won || 17 (16 Merkantil Bank Liga and 1 Hungarian Cup)
|-
|Games drawn || 7 (6 Merkantil Bank Liga and 1 Hungarian Cup)
|-
|Games lost || 6 (5 Merkantil Bank Liga and 1 Hungarian Cup)
|-
|Goals scored || 49
|-
|Goals conceded || 26
|-
|Goal difference || +23
|-
|Yellow cards || 54
|-
|Red cards || 3
|-
|rowspan="1"|Worst discipline ||  István Soltész (8 , 0 )
|-
|rowspan="1"|Best result || 5–0 (A) v Törökszentmiklós - Nemzeti Bajnokság II - 22-09-2019
|-
|rowspan="2"|Worst result || 1–3 (H) v Ajka - Nemzeti Bajnokság II - 15-09-2019
|-
| 0–2 (A) v Ajka - Nemzeti Bajnokság II - 08-03-2020
|-
|rowspan="2"|Most appearances ||  Dávid Kovács (29 appearances)
|-
|  Danijel Romić (29 appearances)
|-
|rowspan="1"|Top scorer ||  Dávid Kovács (18 goals)
|-
|Points || 58/90 (64.44%)
|-

References

External links
 Official Website 
 fixtures and results
 History and others

Budafoki MTE
Hungarian football clubs 2019–20 season